Smile Orange is a 1976 satirical film set in Jamaica. It follows the day-to-day life of Ringo, played by Carl Bradshaw, a smooth-talking waiter and con-man. The film explores the tourism industry in the Caribbean and seems to suggest there are similarities to slavery in that industry.

The film was directed by Trevor D. Rhone, who also wrote the play on which it is based, and was produced by Edward Knight. The movie stars Bradshaw, Glenn Morrison, and Stanley Irons.

Critical acclaim
Trevor Rhone's 1976 Smile Orange has received praise and criticism across the globe. The day after the film's debut in the United States, the New York Times writer Richard Eder remarked on the film's “wittiness and pungency” but criticized its technical cinematographic elements as “terribly awkward.”

Time Out London hailed Smile Orange a “genuinely hilarious politicized farce…a satire on tourism that centers on hotel waiter Ringo Smith's efforts to exploit the exploiters.”

However, perhaps the film's greatest praise comes from The Gleaner, a Jamaican newspaper. On November 6, 2010, writer Andrew Robinson published the newspaper's top five Jamaican films. Smile Orange was placed at number three, and called “comedic, cinematic gold.”

Praise for Smile Orange has carried on through the internet until present day. IMDb calls it “a humorous and somewhat acidic view of the tourism business.”

Ras Zuke, author of Rastaman Vibration has also commented on Smile Orange. He explains that the film allows people to experience the exploited resort culture of Jamaica with a clearer understanding of the relationships between skin color and positions of power, the urban and rural lifestyle conflicts, and the interaction between women and men of Jamaica.

References 

Films set in Jamaica
Films shot in Jamaica
Jamaican comedy films
Jamaican drama films
1976 comedy-drama films
1970s English-language films